The discography of Alexisonfire, a Canadian post-hardcore band, consists of five studio albums, four live albums, eight extended plays and fourteen singles.

All songs were written by Alexisonfire unless noted. Jesse Ingelevics is featured in all songs prior to The Switcheroo Series: Alexisonfire vs. Moneen where Jordan "Ratbeard" Hastings is featured on and after the makings of The Switcheroo Series.

Studio albums

Live albums

Split albums

Demos

Extended plays

Songs

Singles

Non-album tracks

Music videos

References

Discographies of Canadian artists
Post-hardcore group discographies